Narsai (died c. 502) was Syriac poet-theologian.

Narsai may also refer to:

People 
Narsai of Adiabene, 2nd-century Parthian client king of Adiabene
Narsai (Nestorian patriarch), Patriarch of the Church of the East
Narsai David (born 1936), author, radio and television personality in the Bay Area, USA
Narsai Shaba, an ethnic Assyrian professional footballer
Narsai Toma (1941–2014), Metropolitan of the Ancient Church of the East

Writings 
Acts of Narsai, a hagiographical text composed in the middle of the 5th century

See also
Narseh (died 302)
Narses (disambiguation)
Nerses (disambiguation)